Totalfat (stylized as TOTALFAT) is a Japanese melodic punk band formed in 1999. Totalfat consists of vocalist/guitarist Jose (ホセ), vocalist/bassist Shun, and drummer Bunta.

Background
TOTALFAT started out playing NOFX songs in 2000. Their shows were mainly songs of Ten Foot Pole, Millencolin and Slick Shoes.
In 2003, TOTALFAT released their first album entitled End of Introduction, from Japanese independent label Catch All Records. They embarked on a CD release Japan tour which included 41 shows. The first album sold 3,500 copies.
In 2004, TOTALFAT released an EP entitled Get It Better from Catch All Records. Then, they had a CD release tour which included 48 shows around Japan. 
The EP sold about 3,000 copies.
They also play plenty of festivals in Japan, such as Rock in Japan, Punk Spring, and always support Summer Sonic Festival from 2009 to present. Their major label debut was the album Overdrive.

"Place to Try" was the nineteenth ending song for Naruto Shippuden. The song lasted for 11 episodes starting at episode 231.

In April 2019, TOTALFAT announced via their website a concert on October 22, 2019, which will be the last one with Kuboty. The band will remain a three piece from there on.

Band members 
Current members
 Jose — lead vocals, rhythm guitar (1999–present)
 Shun — vocals, bass (1999–present)
 Bunta — drums (1999–present)

Former members
 Toshi — guitar (1999–2000)
 Yasushi — guitar (2000–2005)
 Kuboty — guitar (2004–2019)

Timeline

Discography

Studio albums

Mini albums

Compilation albums

Singles

DVDs

References

External links
 Official blog (in Japanese)

Sony Music Entertainment Japan artists
Japanese punk rock groups